Charles Douglas "Turkey Egg" Greer (May 21, 1921 – January 6, 2016) was an American child actor.

Career and war service
Greer was a semi-regular actor in Our Gang between 1930 and 1932, but also appeared in some feature films besides the gang. He often appeared in roles as a tough kid. Born in Canada, he moved with his family to Glendale, California in 1924. He began working in the movies at age seven after winning a freckle contest. His freckles earned him the name "Turkey Egg" by Our Gang director Robert F. McGowan.

After his retirement from movie business in 1934, Greer founded a successful company for laboratory furniture and supply company. During World War II, he was one of the first members of the 10th Mountain Division Ski Troops at Camp Hale, Colorado. After finishing training, he was transferred to inactive duty to work at Lockheed for a specific job just before his outfit was to head overseas to the Italian Alps. He later discovered that every officer in his company had been either killed or wounded in the first three days of battle. He was honorably discharged on March 31, 1946.

Other
Greer was also a magician and member of the Magic Castle Club. In his later years, Greer was also interviewed in some documentaries about Our Gang.

Personal life
He was preceded in death by his wife, Doris Greer (died 1990), and their only child, daughter, Mrs. Diane Welton; and a grandson, Wesley McCall. At the time of his death at age 94, Greer was survived by three grandchildren and two great-grandchildren.

Filmography
 Song of Love (1929)
 Sunny Side Up (1929)
 Shivering Shakespeare (1930)
 The Arizona Kid (1930)
 School's Out (1930)
 Little Daddy (1931)
 Bargain Day (1931)
 Spanky (1932)
 When a Fellow Needs a Friend (1932)
 Free Wheeling (1932)
 Birthday Blues (1932)
 No Greater Glory (1934)
 The Mighty Barnum (1934)

External links

References

1921 births
2016 deaths
American male child actors
American businesspeople
United States Army personnel of World War II
People from Glendale, California
Male actors from California
Canadian emigrants to the United States
Our Gang